Chicken Cottage Limited is a UK-based fast food chain.  The company is the master franchisor and owner of the "Chicken Cottage" brand. Its taste is modelled on a blend of the Indian subcontinent and Southern United States flavours using halal ingredients. It currently operates through 115 outlets in the UK.

History
Chicken Cottage was established in 1983 as a partnership and incorporated in February 2001. The first Chicken Cottage store was opened in 1983 in Wembley, London.

In February 2012, TI Global Food Holdings Ltd, a subsidiary of Terengganu Incorporated Sdn Bhd (Terengganu Inc), which is the main investment arm of the State of Terengganu, Malaysia, acquired a 22% stake in the company. The remaining 30% was at that point owned by Ri-Yaz Global Food Brands Inc, a subsidiary of Ri-Yaz Holdings, whose main focuses include hospitality, franchise business & development. On 26 February 2019, the company was no longer administration under Terengganu Incorporated after reported sold his warehouse to UK company

Health and safety
On 4 September 2003, the BBC consumer affairs TV programme Rogue Restaurants identified extremely serious environmental health problems with two London outlets of Chicken Cottage where raw chicken was not kept refrigerated for long periods and products were used after their use by dates.  The programme did report that the Chicken Cottage headquarters promised to take remedial action once the BBC had informed them of the problems.

International expansion
Malaysia's first branch opened in Ladang Tok Pelam, Kuala Terengganu in December 2015 and Taman Tun Dr Ismail in Kuala Lumpur (both branches are closed). There are plans to have 50 more outlets, including 15 in Terengganu . Other outlets are in Iraq, Pakistan, Nigeria, Belgium and Italy.

References

External links
 
 

Chicken chains of the United Kingdom
Fast-food chains of the United Kingdom
Fast-food poultry restaurants
Fast-food franchises
Halal restaurants
Restaurants established in 1983
1983 establishments in England
Indian restaurants in the United Kingdom
Pakistani cuisine in the United Kingdom